The Canton of Excideuil is a former canton of the Dordogne département, in France. It was disbanded following the French canton reorganisation which came into effect in March 2015. It consisted of 14 communes, which joined the canton of Isle-Loue-Auvézère in 2015. It had 5,666 inhabitants (2012).

The lowest point is in Saint-Pantaly-d'Excideuil at 120 m, the highest point is in Saint-Mesmin at 415 m, the average elevation is 375 m. The most populated commune was Excideuil with 1,168 inhabitants (2012).

Communes

The canton comprised the following communes:

Anlhiac
Clermont-d'Excideuil
Excideuil
Génis
Preyssac-d'Excideuil
Saint-Germain-des-Prés
Saint-Jory-las-Bloux
Saint-Martial-d'Albarède
Saint-Médard-d'Excideuil
Saint-Mesmin
Saint-Pantaly-d'Excideuil
Saint-Raphaël
Sainte-Trie
Salagnac

Population history

See also 
 Cantons of the Dordogne department

References

 
Former cantons of Dordogne
2015 disestablishments in France
States and territories disestablished in 2015